The Canton of Bray-sur-Somme is a former canton situated in the department of the Somme and in the Picardy region of northern France. It was disbanded following the French canton reorganisation which came into effect in March 2015. It had 6,463 inhabitants (2012).

Geography 
The canton is organised around the commune of Bray-sur-Somme in the arrondissement of Péronne. The altitude varies from 27m (Sailly-le-Sec) to 123m (Suzanne) for an average of 53m.

The canton comprised 19 communes:

Bray-sur-Somme
Cappy
Cerisy
Chipilly
Chuignolles
Éclusier-Vaux
Étinehem
Frise
Herbécourt
Méricourt-l'Abbé
Méricourt-sur-Somme
Morcourt
Morlancourt
La Neuville-lès-Bray
Sailly-Laurette
Sailly-le-Sec
Suzanne
Treux
Ville-sur-Ancre

Population

See also
 Arrondissements of the Somme department
 Cantons of the Somme department
 Communes of the Somme department

References

Bray-sur-Somme
2015 disestablishments in France
States and territories disestablished in 2015